Nether Haddon is a civil parish in the Derbyshire Dales district of Derbyshire, England.  The parish contains 15 listed buildings that are recorded in the National Heritage List for England. Of these, one is listed at Grade I, the highest of the three grades, one is at Grade II*, the middle grade, and the others are at Grade II, the lowest grade. The most important building in the parish is Haddon Hall, which is listed together with associated structures in the gardens and grounds. The River Wye and its tributary, River Lathkill, flow through the parish, and bridges crossing them are listed. The other listed buildings are a farmhouse and associated structures, a barn converted for residential use, and a milestone. 


Key

Buildings

References

Citations

Sources

 

Lists of listed buildings in Derbyshire